Irwinton is a city in Wilkinson County, Georgia, United States. The population was 589 at the 2010 census. The city is the county seat of Wilkinson County.

History
Irwinton was founded in 1811 as the seat of Wilkinson County. The community was named for Governor Jared Irwin. Irwinton was incorporated as a town in 1816 and as a city in 1904.

Geography
Irwinton is located at  (32.812075, -83.176800).

Demographics

2020 census

As of the 2020 United States census, there were 531 people, 166 households, and 113 families residing in the city.

2010 census
As of the census of 2010, there were 583 people, 231 households, and 152 families residing in the city. The racial makeup of the city was 42.01% White, 57.01% African American, and 0.17% from two or more races. Hispanic or Latino of any race were 0.68% of the population.

There were 231 households, out of which 30.7% had children under the age of 18 living with them, 38.1% were married couples living together, 25.1% had a female householder with no husband present, and 33.8% were non-families. 32.5% of all households were made up of individuals, and 16.9% had someone living alone who was 65 years of age or older.  The average household size was 2.47 and the average family size was 3.16.

In the city, the population was spread out, with 25.9% under the age of 18, 10.6% from 18 to 24, 27.4% from 25 to 44, 20.8% from 45 to 64, and 15.3% who were 65 years of age or older.  The median age was 36 years. For every 100 females, there were 88.7 males.  For every 100 females age 18 and over, there were 87.5 males.

The median income for a household in the city was $28,513, and the median income for a family was $32,188. Males had a median income of $29,444 versus $21,154 for females. The per capita income for the city was $13,782.  About 14.9% of families and 21.7% of the population were below the poverty line, including 28.6% of those under age 18 and 24.7% of those age 65 or over.

Education

Wilkinson County School District 
The Wilkinson County School District holds pre-school to grade twelve, and consists of two elementary schools, a middle school, and a high school. The district has 117 full-time teachers and over 1,737 students.
Wilkinson County Elementary School
Wilkinson County Primary School
Wilkinson County Middle School
Wilkinson County High School

Notable people
 G. Harrold Carswell, unsuccessful nominee to the Supreme Court of the United States
 Bud Dupree, outside linebacker for the NFL's Pittsburgh Steelers
 Julian Robert Lindsey, United States Army Major General

References

External links
Irwinton website

Cities in Georgia (U.S. state)
Cities in Wilkinson County, Georgia
County seats in Georgia (U.S. state)